Diede de Groot defeated the defending champion Yui Kamiji in the final, 6–2, 6–3 to win the women's singles wheelchair tennis title at the 2018 US Open. It was her first US Open singles title, and was her second step towards a non-calendar-year Grand Slam.

Seeds

Draw

Bracket

External links 

 Draw

Wheelchair Women's Singles
U.S. Open, 2018 Women's Singles